Jamestown is an extinct town in Chattahoochee County, Georgia, United States.

History
A post office called Jamestown was established in 1849, and remained in operation until 1914. The community was named after John A. James, a railroad agent.

References

Geography of Chattahoochee County, Georgia
Ghost towns in Georgia (U.S. state)